Games of the XXI Olympiad is the fourth album by Melbourne electronica band Black Cab. It was released in 2014.

The album continues the theme of their 2009 Call Signs album, which was inspired by Cold War-era East Germany, with the new album themed on the 1976 Montreal Olympics, where a state-sanctioned regimen of performance-enhancing drugs produced a generation of chemically superhuman East German athletes. A version of the album was prepared for release in 2012 but was abandoned when the band decided it was neither complete nor very good. Songs were stripped down and extended, in the process transforming "Supermädchen" from four minutes to almost 10.

The album, far more electronica-based than its predecessors, was produced in multiple sessions with different producers and mixers, including Woody Annison, Simon Polinski and former Death in Vegas member Tim Holmes. Two earlier singles, "Combat Boots" (2011) and "Sexy Polizei" (2010) were also included.

Track listing
(all songs by Black Cab)
 "Opening Ceremony" — 2:32
 "Supermädchen" — 9:49
 "Victorious" — 6:34
 "Performance Center Obertauern" — 3:19
 "Kornelia Ender" — 4:48
 "Go Slow" — 6:07
 "Problem Child" — 4:13
 "Combat Boots" — 4:41
 "Little Blue Ones" — 5:56
 "My War" — 5:42
 "Sexy Polizei" — 4:07
 "State Plan 14.25" — 5:07
 "Closing Ceremony" — 4:27

Personnel

 James Lee — guitar, keyboards
 Andrew Coates — vocals, programming, keyboards
 Wes Holland — live drums

Additional musicians 
 Steve Law — sequences, drones
 Shags Chamberlain — bass, moog
 Richard Andrew — juno, guitar, drums
 Anthony Paine — bass
 Alex Jarvis — guitar
 Dyko — electronic percussion
 Lucy Buckeridge — backing vocals
 Monique Brumby — backing vocals
 Raffaela Jungbauer — spoken word

References

2014 albums
Black Cab (band) albums
Concept albums